1KUNS-PF (1st Kenyan University NanoSatellite-Precursor Flight) was the first Kenyan owned satellite to be launched into space. The cubesat was developed and assembled by the University of Nairobi. Technical support was provided by Japan's Aerospace Exploration Agency and it was launched from the International Space Station by a SpaceX Falcon 9 rocket.

Background  
The idea to have a Kenyan built satellite in space began in September 2015 with the planning and design of the space module. Financial support was obtained for the project when the University of Nairobi won a competitive grant from the United Nations Office for Outer Space Affairs (UNOOSA) in 2016. The University of Nairobi was the first institution to benefit from a joint project between the United Nations and JAXA. The satellite was given the acronym 1KUNS-PF which in full is First Kenya University Nano Satellite-Precursor Flight. External technical support was provided by Sapienza University together with two Italian companies. The cost of the programme was about a million dollars.

Launch and purpose 
On 2 April 2018, the satellite was carried on the International Space Station on board a SpaceX CRS-14 which was launched on a Falcon 9 rocket with help from the National Aeronautic and Space Administration. It was deployed from the space station into its orbit from the Kibō module on 11 May 2018. Its signal was successfully received from the Ground Station in Rome by the students of Sapienza University of Rome. Its launch was the third for an African country after GhanaSat-1 and Nigeria EduSat-1 which went into service in 2017. In addition to 1KUNS-PF two other nano satellites, Ubakusat and Proyecto Irazú were also on board the Falcon-9 rocket to the ISS. All three satellites were deployed into space from the ISS by Japanese astronaut Norishige Kanai.

The 1KUNS-PF was a 1 unit cubesat. It was an experimental cubesat, with the main mission being to create awareness to the locals on the benefits of space uses. On board the cubesat, there were camera payloads, which were used to take mapping images of Kenya and other East Africa countries within the vicinity of its orbit. The cubesat was designed to have a lifespan of one year and its operations were within the UN space use mitigation measures. 1KUNS-PF deorbited in June 2020.

References

Satellites orbiting Earth
CubeSats
First artificial satellites of a country
Science and technology in Kenya
Spacecraft launched in 2018
Student satellites
Satellites deployed from the International Space Station
2018 in Kenya